Nicholas William Hanges was a mathematician at the City University of New York, known for his work in partial differential equations and the theory of several complex variables. He was a Professor of Mathematics at Lehman College.

Education and career
Hanges earned his B.S degree in mathematics from the New York City College in 1970. He received his M.A. (1975) and Ph.D. (1976) from Purdue University, under the supervision of M. Salah Baouendi.
He was a visiting scholar at the Institute for Advanced Study in 1977-1978, 1980-1981, 1991-1992 and again in 1994. In 1983, Hanges joined the faculty of Lehman College, City University of New York as a Professor of Mathematics from the University of Pittsburgh. From 2017 he served as Chairman of the Mathematics Department.

Awards and honors
In 1982, Hanges received an Alfred P. Sloan Research Fellowship.

Selected publications
Hanges, Nicholas. "Explicit formulas for the Szegö kernel for some domains in C2". Journal of Functional Analysis 88(1) 153-165 (1990). DOI:10.1016/0022-1236(90)90123-3
Hanges, Nicholas. "Analytic regularity for an operator with Treves curves". Journal of Functional Analysis 210(2) 295-320 (2004). DOI:10.1016/j.jfa.2003.12.006
Cordaro, Paulo D.; Hanges, Nicholas. "Hyperfunctions and (analytic) hypoellipticity". Mathematische Annalen 344(2) 329-339 (2009). MR 2495773
Cordaro, Paulo D.; Hanges, Nicholas. "A new proof of Okaji’s theorem for a class of sum of squares operators". Ann. Inst. Fourier (Grenoble) 59(2), 595–619 (2009). MR 2521430
Cordaro, Paulo D.; Hanges, Nicholas. "Hypoellipticity in spaces of ultradistributions—Study of a model case". Israel Journal of Mathematics 191, 771–789 (2012). MR 3011496

References

External links 
Lehman College Faculty bios

2019 deaths
20th-century American mathematicians
21st-century American mathematicians
Purdue University alumni
City College of New York alumni
Institute for Advanced Study visiting scholars
City University of New York faculty
Lehman College faculty
Sloan Research Fellows
Mathematicians from New York (state)
Year of birth missing